Canon Robert Paul (Bob) Reiss  (born 20 January 1943)is an Anglican priest and author.

Reiss was educated at Haberdashers' Aske's Boys' School; Trinity College, Cambridge; and Westcott House, Cambridge. he was ordained deacon in 1969, and priest in 1970. After a curacy in St John's Wood he was assistant missioner at Rajshahi, Bangladesh then chaplain at his old college. He was selection secretary for the ACCM from 1978 to 1985; team rector of Grantham from 1986 to 1996; Archdeacon of Surrey from 1996 to 2005; and canon treasurer of Westminster Abbey from 2005 until 2013.

References

Living people
1943 births
Archdeacons of Surrey
People educated at Haberdashers' Boys' School
Alumni of Trinity College, Cambridge
Alumni of Westcott House, Cambridge
Holders of a Lambeth degree